Haplomitrium grollei is a species of liverwort from India.

References

Calobryales
Plants described in 1977
Flora of India (region)